Sumru Çörtoğlu (born May 13, 1943) is a high-ranked Turkish judge. She served as the Chief Justice of the Turkish Council of State.

On May 3, 2006, Sumru Çörtoğlu, who was the Head of the 4th Department of the Council of State since February 12, 2001, was elected as the new Chief Justice after winning the 68th round of voting. She succeeded Enver Çetinkaya in this post.

She was born in Tokat. She is married and has two children.

See also
 Legal System in the Republic of Turkey

References

External links
 Who is who 

1943 births
People from Tokat
Turkish judges
Turkish women civil servants
Turkish civil servants
Living people
Presidents of the Council of State (Turkey)